Peperino is an Italian word describing a brown or grey volcanic tuff, containing fragments of basalt and limestone, with disseminated crystals of augite, mica, magnetite, leucite, and other similar minerals. The name originally referred to the dark-colored inclusions, suggestive of peppercorns.

The typical peperino occurs in the Alban Hills and in Soriano nel Cimino, near Rome, and was used by the ancient Romans under the name of lapis albanus as a building stone and for the basins of fountains.

Other tuffs and conglomerates in Auvergne and elsewhere are also called peperino.  In English the word has sometimes been written "peperine".

References

Igneous petrology
Igneous rocks
Pyroclastic rocks